Lin Yanfen (born January 4, 1971) is a Chinese female badminton player of the 1990s.

Career
Lin was a women's doubles specialist who paired with Yao Fen to win several top tier international tournaments. These included the Swedish (1992), China (1992), and French (1993) Opens, the Badminton World Cup (1992), the World Badminton Grand Prix (1992), and the prestigious All-England Championships in 1992. Lin and Yao were bronze medalists at the 1992 Barcelona Olympics and runners-up at the 1993 All Englands. Lin was a member of China's winning Uber Cup (women's international) team of 1992.

External links
profile

1971 births
Living people
Badminton players from Guangzhou
Badminton players at the 1992 Summer Olympics
Olympic badminton players of China
Olympic bronze medalists for China
Olympic medalists in badminton
Chinese female badminton players

Medalists at the 1992 Summer Olympics
20th-century Chinese women